Genex Power is an Australian electricity generation company. It owns the Kidston Solar Project which has been generating up to 50 MW of electricity since 2017. It is developing the associated Kidston Pumped Hydro storage using the abandoned Kidston Gold Mine.

Genex Power later proposes to expand the solar farm and add a wind farm in the same area.

References

Electric power companies of Australia
Companies listed on the Australian Securities Exchange